On 1 July 2018, a suicide bomber detonated in the center of the eastern Afghan city of Jalalabad, killing 20 people, mainly Sikhs and Hindus, and injuring 20 others.

Responsibility

The Islamic State group claimed responsibility for the attack, saying it targeted Afghan Special Forces. In a further statement they said that 60 Afghan soldiers and "polytheists" were killed and wounded in an operation in the city of Jalalabad.

References

2018 murders in Afghanistan
Suicide bombings in 2018
ISIL terrorist incidents in Afghanistan
Islamic terrorist incidents in 2018
Jalalabad
July 2018 crimes in Asia
Mass murder in 2018
Mass murder in Afghanistan
Suicide bombings in Afghanistan
Terrorist incidents in Afghanistan in 2018